Jalan Kayu Constituency was a single member constituency in Jalan Kayu, Singapore, between 1959 and 1988.

Formation and dissolution
After the 1951 election, the present Jalan Kayu Single Member Constituency constituted the majority of the Seletar ward; that ward was dissolved prior to the 1959 election, producing the Jalan Kayu ward, the then Thomson ward, and small parts of Nee Soon ward. Following its dissolution in 1988, Jalan Kayu was incorporated into the new Cheng San Group Representation Constituency. The People's Action Party had held the ward by a narrow margin of 571 votes in the 1984 election.

Member of Parliament

Elections

Elections in 1980s

Note: Madai Puthan Damodaran Nair was offered the first and only Non-constituency Member of Parliament (NCMP) seat, only to reject it. The seat was subsequently offered to Tan Chee Kien, the second best performing but lost the election opposition candidate who ran in Kaki Bukit SMC under the Singapore United Front's banner as auxiliary NCMP who had also promptly declined the offer. This is the only general election that oversees the Opposition candidates had declined NCMP offers since the introduction of NCMP scheme prior to 1984 general elections. The only other election after the introduction of NCMP scheme that sees no NCMP legislator was after the 1991 general election where 4 opposition legislators were elected, which had exceeded the maximum of 3 NCMP seats (Each NCMP seat is reduced when each opposition candidate has been elected for a particular ward).

Elections in 1970s

Elections in 1960s

Notes: The then incumbent Tan Cheng Tong from People's Action Party had attempted to seek another term, but this time round he joined Barisan Sosialis instead and win the election, despite his votes' share was slashed by nearly half.

Elections in 1950s

Notes: Madai Puthan Damodaran Nair has contested here in every GE since the inception of this ward, with the exceptions in 1967 by-elections and 1968 elections where he stood as an independent candidate in Thomson and Farrer Park wards respectively. He had previously elected in Seletar ward, which has since evolved into this ward and also went through up and downs, from an end of almost being elected MP since the independence of Singapore in 1984 elections when he represented the Workers' Party of Singapore and subsequently offered but declined the Non-constituency Member of Parliament seat to lost his election deposit in 1963 elections when he was one of the candidate that entered into the multi-cornered fight's fray under the banner of Singapore Alliance.

References

1988 GE's result
1984 GE's result
1980 GE's result
1976 GE's result
1972 GE's result
1968 GE's result
1967 BE's result
1963 GE's result
1959 GE's result

See also
Ang Mo Kio GRC
Cheng San GRC

Hougang
Sengkang
Punggol
1958 establishments in Singapore
1988 disestablishments